Sohrab Uddin is a Bangladesh Nationalist Party politician and the former member of parliament from Kushtia-3.

Career
Uddin was elected to Parliament in 2001 from Kushtia-3 as a candidate of Bangladesh Nationalist Party. He is the organising secretary of Kushtia District unit of Bangladesh Nationalist Party. He is the president of Jatiyatabadi Muktijoddha Dal. Uddin was sued for corruption on 23 September 2007 in Kushtia. His home was attacked on March 2009 by unknown individuals.

References

Bangladesh Nationalist Party politicians
Living people
8th Jatiya Sangsad members
1953 births
Islamic University, Bangladesh alumni